Marek Jan Siemek (November 27, 1942 – May 30, 2011) was a Polish philosopher and historian of German transcendental philosophy (German idealism). He was a professor at the Institute of Philosophy of the University of Warsaw and the director of its Department of Social Philosophy.

Marek Siemek was a disciple of Bronisław Baczko, one of the main representatives of the Warsaw School of the History of Ideas. In his early works Siemek interprets marxism as a form of transcendental philosophy. In his later works ha abandons Marxism for hegelianism interpreted as transcendental social philosophy.

From 1986 member of International Advisory Committee of The Internationale Hegel-Gesellschaft. Fellow of Collegium Invisibile. On 10 February 2006 he received doctorate honoris causa of the University of Bonn.

Marek Siemek had one son, currently residing in the United States.

Main publications 
 Fryderyk Schiller, Warszawa, Wiedza Powszechna, 1970
 Idea transcendentalizmu u Fichtego i Kanta, Warszawa, PWN, 1977
 Filozofia, dialektyka, rzeczywistość, Warszawa, PIW, 1982
 W kręgu filozofów, Warszawa, Czytelnik, 1984
 Filozofia spełnionej nowoczesności - Hegel, Wykłady Kopernikańskie w Humanistyce, vol. 2, Toruń, Wydawnictwo UMK, 1995.
 Hegel i filozofia, Warszawa, Oficyna Naukowa, 1998
 Vernunft und Intersubjektivität. Zur philosophisch-politischen Identität der europäischen Moderne, Baden-Baden, Nomos Verlagsgesellschaft, 2000
 Wolność, rozum, intersubiektywność, Warszawa, Oficyna Naukowa, 2002

Translations 
 "Prawdy szukamy obaj". Z korespondencji między Goethem i Schillerem, with Jerzy Prokopiuk, Czytelnik, Warszawa 1974 (translation of the correspondence between Goethe and Schiller)
 Martin Heidegger, Nauka i namysł; Przezwyciężenie metafizyki, in: Martin Heidegger, Budować, mieszkać, myśleć. Eseje wybrane, Czytelnik, Warszawa 1977
 György Lukács, Młody Hegel. O powiązaniach dialektyki z ekonomią, BKF, PWN, Warszawa 1980
 György Lukács, Historia i świadomość klasowa., BWF, PWN, Warszawa 1988.
 Georg Wilhelm Friedrich Hegel, Życie Jezusa, in: Zygmunt Freud, Mojżesz i monoteizm, Czytelnik, Warszawa 1995.
 Johann Gottlieb Fichte, Teoria Wiedzy. Wybór pism, vol. 1, BKF, PWN, Warszawa 1996

References

External links 
 Marek Siemek's page at the Institute of Philosophy of the University of Warsaw
 Stanisław Gromadzki, Marcin Miłkowski, Wstęp (Introduction) to the philosophical journal Przegląd Filozoficzno-Literacki 1(16)/2007

20th-century Polish philosophers
21st-century Polish philosophers
1942 births
2011 deaths
Academic staff of the University of Warsaw
Polish historians of philosophy
Fellows of Collegium Invisibile
Commanders of the Order of Polonia Restituta
Members of the European Academy of Sciences and Arts